Vasıf Çetinel (1928 – 9 November 2020) was a Turkish footballer. He competed in the men's tournament at the 1952 Summer Olympics.

References

External links
 

1928 births
2020 deaths
Turkish footballers
Olympic footballers of Turkey
Footballers at the 1952 Summer Olympics
Place of birth missing
Association football midfielders
Turkish military officers